The Congress of Democratic Trade Unions  (French: Centrale des syndicats démocratiques, CSD) is a national trade union centre in Quebec formed on 8 June 1972 in response to a split within the Confederation of National Trade Unions Confédération des syndicats nationaux, CSN).
It is the smallest of the four labour centres in Quebec, with about 4% (62,770 members) of the union membership in the province. 

The split was led by dissident members of the CSN executive Paul-Émilien Dalpé, Jacques Dion and Amédée Daigle, referred to as the "Three Ds", who said they wanted a more democratic union body and one which would be politically neutral, as distinct from the political militancy of the CSN. Paul-Émile Dalpé was the first president of the CSD, Dion was treasurer and Daigle was director of services. Jean-Paul Hétu was vice-president and Réal Labelle was secretary.

Dalpé was succeeded as president by Jean-Paul Hétu who held office until 1989, when Claude Gingras became president.

See also

Fédération des travailleurs et travailleuses du Québec (FTQ)
Confédération des syndicats nationaux (CSN)
Centrale des syndicats du Québec (CSQ)
List of trade unions in Quebec
List of trade unions in Canada

References

CSN, CSQ; Histoire du mouvement ouvrier au Québec, 150 ans de lutte, Montréal, 1984. 
ROUILLARD, Jacques; Le syndicalisme québécois, deux siècles d'histoire, Montréal:  Boréal, 2004. 

Trade unions in Quebec
Provincial federations of labour (Canada)
Trade unions established in 1972
1972 establishments in Quebec